Craig O'Dwyer is an Australian former professional rugby league footballer who played in the 1990s. He played for Eastern Suburbs, Penrith and South Queensland in the NSWRL/ARL competitions.

Playing career
O'Dwyer made his first grade debut for Eastern Suburbs in round 3 of the 1993 NSWRL season against Western Suburbs at Campbelltown Sports Stadium. In 1994, O'Dwyer signed with Penrith but was limited to only two appearances which were both from the interchange bench. In 1995, O'Dwyer signed for the newly admitted South Queensland side and played in the clubs first ever victory which came in round 5 against North Sydney. In 1996, O'Dwyer played eight games for the club mainly at halfback as they finished with the Wooden Spoon.

References

South Queensland Crushers players
Penrith Panthers players
Sydney Roosters players
Year of birth missing (living people)
Australian rugby league players
Rugby league hookers
Rugby league halfbacks
Living people